Richard DiLallo is the co-author (along with James Patterson) of the #1 New York Times bestseller Alex Cross's Trial.

He has had articles published in Glamour, Brides, and America.

He is former executive vice president and executive creative director of DDB Worldwide (Chicago).

References

External link
http://www.booksamillion.com/product/9780316070621

American male writers
Living people
Year of birth missing (living people)
Place of birth missing (living people)